The Andrew Carnegie Medal for Excellence in Children's Video was named in honor of nineteenth-century American philanthropist Andrew Carnegie. It honored the producer of the most outstanding video production for children.  The Medal was supported by the Carnegie Corporation of New York and was administered by the Association for Library Service to Children (ALSC), a division of the American Library Association (ALA), through a Carnegie endowment.

Criteria
 The video must have demonstrated excellence in the execution of the special techniques of the medium; in the visual interpretation of story, theme, or concept; in the use of sound; in the delineation of plot, theme, characters, mood setting, or information presented; in the acting, when appropriate; and in the appropriateness of technique or treatment to the story, theme, or concept.
The video must have demonstrate excellence of presentation for a child audience (age 0–14 years).
The video may have been in cassette or DVD format.
 Only one Medal was presented, regardless of the number of producers involved in the video selected.
The video must have been distributed in the United States. Videos originally released in other countries were not eligible.
The award was limited to producers who are citizens or residents of the United States.
 The video could have been feature length, but not a theatrically released feature.
 The video could have been based on another medium or made for another medium (e.g., television).
 Adaptations of material originally produced in other mediums should have remained true to, expand, or complement the original work in some way.
 The video should have been available for use in homes, public libraries, and with community organizations.
 The award was given only for work produced during the previous year, not for a body of work.

Recipients

Recipients of Multiple Awards
Out of twenty-six awards:
 Paul R. Gagne has received thirteen Carnegie Medals (always while working for Weston Woods Studios).
 Melissa Reilly has received nine Carnegie Medals (always while working with Paul R. Gagne at Weston Woods Studios).
 Weston Woods Studios has received sixteen Carnegie Medals.

See also

References

External links
 
 
 
 
 
 
 
 
 
 
 
 
 

American film awards
American Library Association awards
Awards established in 1991
1991 establishments in the United States
English-language literary awards